The Oxaeinae are an exclusively American subfamily of the bee family Andrenidae, consisting of large (13–26 mm), fast-flying bees, often with large eyes. The four constituent genera, with a total of 19 described species, range from the United States to Argentina. Some resources still use the name Oxaeidae, and treat them as a family, but they were moved to subfamily status in 1995.

They can be best recognized by the extremely low position of the ocelli on their faces, a feature not shared by any other large bees. Their nests are deep burrows in the ground, and provisions are a soupy mixture of pollen and nectar in cells with a waxlike waterproof lining.

References 
C. D. Michener (2007) The Bees of the World, 2nd Edition, Johns Hopkins University Press.

Andrenidae
Apocrita subfamilies